Mathieu Perget (born 18 September 1984 in Montauban) is a French former professional road bicycle racer. His last win of his career was the 10 day Tour du Maroc in 2013.

Major results

2005
1st Road race, Mediterranean Games
2nd Overall Tour de Gironde
1st Stage 3
3rd World Under-19 Time Trial Championships
3rd Overall Circuit des Ardennes
8th Overall Ronde de l'Isard
1st Stage 4
10th Overall Critérium des Espoirs
2007
91st Overall Giro d'Italia
2008
112th Overall Giro d'Italia
2009
1st Overall Tour du Limousin
1st Stage 2 (TTT) Tour Méditerranéen
7th Overall Tour de l'Ain
9th Overall Route du Sud
72nd Overall Giro d'Italia
2010
63rd Overall Tour de France
 Combativity award (Stage 6)
2011
24th Overall Vuelta a España
2012
4th Overall Tour du Limousin
5th Overall Route du Sud
2013
1st Overall Tour du Maroc
1st Stage 2
1st Mountains classification
1st Prologue (TTT) Tour de Guadeloupe
Challenge du Prince
2nd Trophée de la Maison Royale
4th Trophée de l'Anniversaire
7th Trophée Princier

References

External links 

French male cyclists
1984 births
Living people
People from Montauban
Mediterranean Games gold medalists for France
Mediterranean Games medalists in cycling
Competitors at the 2005 Mediterranean Games
Sportspeople from Tarn-et-Garonne
Cyclists from Occitania (administrative region)